Yohanes Shiferaw Yohanes (born 12 December 1973) is an Ethiopian boxer. He competed in the men's featherweight event at the 2000 Summer Olympics.

References

1973 births
Living people
Ethiopian male boxers
Olympic boxers of Ethiopia
Boxers at the 2000 Summer Olympics
Place of birth missing (living people)
African Games medalists in boxing
Featherweight boxers
African Games bronze medalists for Ethiopia
Competitors at the 1999 All-Africa Games